Arnsberg may refer to:

Arnsberg, a city in Hochsauerlandkreis, Germany
Arnsberg (region), Regierungsbezirk of North Rhine-Westphalia, Germany
Arnsberg (Rhön), a mountain in Bavaria
Arnsberg, Missouri, a community in the United States

People
Brad Arnsberg (b. 1963) American Baseball player